Greencastle or Green Castle may refer to:

Places

Germany
 Green Castle (Grünes Schloss), Weimar; see Duchess Anna Amalia Library

Ireland
 Greencastle, County Donegal, Republic of Ireland
 Greencastle, County Down, Northern Ireland
 Greencastle, County Tyrone, Northern Ireland

Scotland
 Green Castle, Portknockie, an Iron Age and Pictish promontory fort

United States
 Greencastle, Indiana, a city
 Greencastle, Missouri, a city
 Greencastle, Pennsylvania, a borough
 Greencastle, West Virginia, an unincorporated community
 Greencastle, Kanawha County, West Virginia, an unincorporated community

Other uses
 Greencastle (film)